Hacımahmudlu (also, Hajymahmudlu and Hajy-Mahmudlu) is a village in the Yevlakh District of Azerbaijan. The village forms part of the municipality of Garamanly.

References 

Populated places in Yevlakh District